The extinct genus Hedstroemia was once thought to be a rivulariacean cyanobacterium. It forms oval blobs composed of sinuous tubes that have rounded outlines and occurs in conjunction with Solenopora.

Hedstroemia was formerly assigned to the now obsolete taxon porostromata. In 2020, the genus was assigned to the cyanobacteria order Nostocales.

References 

Ulvophyceae genera
Bryopsidales